The women's pentathlon at the 2012 IAAF World Indoor Championships took place March 9 at the Ataköy Athletics Arena.  8 athletes from 6 countries participated.  Ukrainian Nataliya Dobrynska won with a world record points total of 5013, breaking the previous record of 4991 held by Irina Belova.

Medalists

Records

Qualification standards
 the three best athletes from the previous year’s Outdoor Lists (as at 31 December), limited to a maximum of one per country and 
 the three best athletes from the Indoor Lists during the year of the Competition
 two athletes which may be invited at the discretion of the IAAF
In total no more than two male and two female athletes from any one Member will be invited.
Upon refusals or cancellations, the invitations shall be extended to the next ranked athletes in the same lists respecting the above conditions.
Members whose athletes are invited as above will receive additional quota places accordingly

Schedule

Results

60 metres hurdles

High jump

Shot put

Long jump

800 metres

The 800 metres run was held at 19:37.

Final standings

References

Pentathlon
Combined events at the World Athletics Indoor Championships
2012 in women's athletics